was a Japanese samurai of the Sengoku period who served the Imagawa clan. Tsuratatsu served Imagawa Ujizane and held Hikuma in Tôtômi province. He was the husband of Otazu no kata and Iio Noritsura's son. In 1564, the Imagawa discovered that he was secretly communicating with Tokugawa Ieyasu and attacked him. Peace was made, but the following year he was summoned by Ujizane to Suruga, where he was assassinated.

Samurai
1566 deaths
Year of birth missing
Japanese warriors killed in battle